Mathilde Sofie Hess Henning is a Danish fashion model.

Career 

Henning began modeling in Copenhagen, for Danish brands like Ganni, and appeared on the cover of the British fashion magazine i-D, photographed by David Sims. On the runway, she opened as for Saint Laurent as an exclusive during Paris Fashion Week; she appeared in an editorial for Vogue Paris, photographed by Christian MacDonald. She appeared on the decennial cover of Elle Denmark. Models.com selected her as having one of the best "breakout seasons" on the runway for 2019, having walked for designers including Tom Ford, Versace, Saint Laurent, and Chanel. She has also walked for Vera Wang, Chloé, Michael Kors, Stella McCartney, Tory Burch, Nina Ricci, Dolce & Gabbana, Hermès, Roberto Cavalli, Fendi, Moschino, Balmain, Alberta Ferretti, Isabel Marant, Coach, Inc., Lacoste, Valentino, Ralph Lauren, and various others.

References 

Living people
Year of birth missing (living people)
Danish female models
Women Management models